The 2017 Tour of Slovenia was the 24th edition of the Tour of Slovenia cycling stage race, held between 15 and 18 June.

The race was decided on the race's queen stage, with the top-three stage placings taking the final podium positions. Rafał Majka won both the general and mountains classification, by taking first place at the summit finish in Rogla.

In the race's other classifications, Majka's teammate Sam Bennett won the points classification in a three-way tiebreak with Luka Mezgec and Sonny Colbrelli, as Bennett won two stages during the race; Tadej Pogačar was the winner of the under-23 young rider classification in fifth place overall, while  were the winners of the teams classification.

Schedule

Participating teams
Eighteen teams were initially announced for the 2017 edition, but a 19th team –  – was added a month before the race.

Stages

Stage 1
15 June 2017 — Koper to Kočevje,

Stage 2
16 June 2017 — Ljubljana to Ljubljana,

Stage 3
17 June 2017 — Celje to Rogla,

Stage 4
18 June 2017 — Rogaška Slatina to Novo Mesto,

Classification leadership table
In the 2017 Tour of Slovenia, four different jerseys were awarded. The general classification was calculated by adding each cyclist's finishing times on each stage, and allowing time bonuses for the first three finishers at intermediate sprints (three seconds to first, two seconds to second and one second to third) and at the finish of mass-start stages; these were awarded to the first three finishers on all stages: the stage winner won a ten-second bonus, with six and four seconds for the second and third riders respectively. The leader of the classification received a green jersey; it was considered the most important of the 2017 Tour of Slovenia, and the winner of the classification was considered the winner of the race.

Additionally, there was a points classification, which awarded a red jersey. In the points classification, cyclists received points for finishing in the top 15 in a stage. For winning a stage, a rider earned 25 points, with 20 for second, 16 for third, 14 for fourth, 12 for fifth, 10 for sixth and a point fewer per place down to 1 point for 15th place. Points towards the classification could also be accrued – awarded on a 5–3–1 scale – at intermediate sprint points during each stage; these intermediate sprints also offered bonus seconds towards the general classification as noted above.

There was also a mountains classification, the leadership of which was marked by a blue jersey.  In the mountains classification, points towards the classification were won by reaching the top of a climb before other cyclists. Each climb was categorised as either first, second, or third-category, with more points available for the higher-categorised climbs. The fourth and final jersey represented the classification for young riders, marked by a white jersey. This was decided the same way as the general classification, but only riders born after 1 January 1995 were eligible to be ranked in the classification. There was also a classification for teams, in which the times of the best three cyclists per team on each stage were added together; the leading team at the end of the race was the team with the lowest total time.

Best young rider (under 23 years) by time was awarded with white jersey.

References

External links

2017
2017 in Slovenian sport
2017 UCI Europe Tour